The Division of Southern Melbourne was an Australian electoral division in the state of Victoria. It was located in the inner southern area of Melbourne, and included the suburbs of Albert Park, St Kilda, South Melbourne and South Yarra.

The division was proclaimed in 1900, and was one of the original 65 divisions to be contested at the first federal election. At the redistribution of 13 July 1906, it was abolished and replaced by the Division of Fawkner, which was itself abolished in 1969.

Members

Election results

1901 establishments in Australia
1906 disestablishments in Australia
Former electoral divisions of Australia
Constituencies established in 1901
Constituencies disestablished in 1906